In Love Again: The Music of Richard Rodgers is a 2002 studio album by Stacey Kent, of the songs of the American composer Richard Rodgers.

Reception

David R. Adler writing on Allmusic.com gave the album three stars out of five. Adler said the "burlesque-ish 6/8 middle section" of "I'm Gonna Wash That Man Right Outa My Hair" works "amazingly well". He went on to say: "The sound of the disc is strong, highlighting the nicely varied arrangements and the innate charm of Kent's puckish voice." However, he criticized an "aimless bossa nova reading of 'It Might as Well Be Spring,' and a general overabundance of ballads".

Track listing 
 "Shall We Dance?" (Oscar Hammerstein II) - 3:42
 "Bewitched, Bothered and Bewildered" (Lorenz Hart) - 5:05
 "My Heart Stood Still" (Hart) - 2:57
 "It Never Entered My Mind" (Hart) - 4:39
 "I Wish I Were in Love Again" (Hart) - 4:06
 "Thou Swell" (Hart) - 4:52
 "It Might as Well Be Spring" (Hammerstein) - 4:39
 "Nobody's Heart (Belongs to Me)" (Hart) - 3:48
 "I'm Gonna Wash That Man Right Outta My Hair" (Hammerstein) - 4:35
 "This Can't Be Love" (Hart) - 3:07
 "Easy to Remember" (Hart) - 4:57
 "Manhattan" (Hart) - 4:22
 "Bali Ha'i" (Hammerstein) - 3:00

All music composed by Richard Rodgers, lyricists indicated.

Personnel 
Performance
 Stacey Kent – vocals, arranger
 Jim Tomlinson - flute, tenor saxophone, arranger, producer
 David Newton - piano
 Colin Oxley - guitar
 Simon Thorpe - double bass
 Jesper Kviberg - drums
Production
 Curtis Schwartz - engineer, mixing
 Alan Bates - executive producer, liner notes
 Mental Block - design
 Kate Messer - make-up

References 

2002 albums
Stacey Kent albums
Candid Records albums